Linus Suryadi Agustinus, commonly known Linus Suryadi AG or Linus Suryadi AGN was born in  Sleman, Indonesia on 3 March 1951 and died in Yogyakarta on 30 July 1999 at the age of 48.

Linus Suryadi studied at IKIP Sanata Dharma and began publishing poems and essays while still in his late teens. He studied English in college but left before completion, and worked on various newspapers and magazines in Yogyakarta. According to Harry Aveling, Suryadi's prose-lyric Pengakuan Pariyem (Pariyem's Confession) attracted considerable attention for its bold use of Javanese words and phrases. In Pengakuan Pariyem, Suryadi describes the life of a female servant of a noble family which is limited by the traditions of the court town of Yogyakarta. Even though this prose poem was hailed as a penetrating analysis of culture that reveals Javanese social life, Niels Mulder suggests that it is basically an idealization of a system of values that belongs to the past.

In 1982, Linus Suryadi AG studied at the International Writing Program in Iowa in the U.S. He was a member of the Yogyakarta Arts Council and was the editor of Citra Yogya, a journal of art and culture.

Linus Suryadi AG was also the editor of Tonggak: Antologi Puisi Indonesia Modern (The Beginning: Anthology of Modern Indonesian Poetry), a four volume set of Indonesian poetry that spans 60 years, from the 1920s to the 1980s 

According to E. Ulrich Kratz, Linus Suryadi AG, along with Ahmad Tohari, Aspar, Gerson Poyk, Korrie Layun Rampan, Umar Kayam and Wildan Yatim are Indonesian authors who "consciously and successfully have made an Indonesian regional setting the focus of their prose fiction."

Selected works

Works by Linus Suryadi AG can also be found in the following anthologies:
Biru Langit Biru (1977: Ajip Rosidi [ed.])

This Same Sky: A Collection of Poems from Around the World (1992; Naomi Shihab Nye [ed.])

References

1951 births
Indonesian Christians
Indonesian writers
Indonesian male poets
People from Sleman Regency
1999 deaths
20th-century Indonesian poets
20th-century male writers